Plummer Park is a park in West Hollywood, California, United States, on the eastern side of the city. The park is between Santa Monica Boulevard and Fountain Avenue, bordered by North Vista Street and North Fuller Avenue, 6 blocks west of La Brea Avenue.

The east side of West Hollywood is dominated by Russian speaking immigrants, and the park is a popular gathering place for Russians.

History 

Plummer Park and Plummer House were acquired by Los Angeles County from Senor Plummer in 1937 for $15,000. The Los Angeles Audubon Society (LAAS) has been headquartered in Plummer House since then and (in 1983) moved into another building in Plummer Park (Great Hall-Long Hall) which was originally constructed by the Works Progress Administration (WPA) in 1937.

In 2005, a controversial monument to Soviet Army dead in World War II was built in the park. While supported by many local residents, it was criticized as being inappropriate given that some might interpret it as honoring the USSR under Joseph Stalin.

In May 2011 the Audubon Society was given notice to leave by the city of West Hollywood who are planning to demolish the building in 2012 and create underground parking as part of a controversial plan to create a modern park. A group of residents called Protect Plummer Park was organized in early 2011 to preserve the historic Plummer Park.

Designations 
Plummer Park and Plummer House (which was built in 1870 and moved to the Leonis Adobe grounds in Calabasas in 1983) have been designated a State Historic Landmark by the State of California in 1956.

On May 1, 2013, the California Historic Resources Commission vote to approve the nomination to place the Great Hall-Long Hall in the National Register of Historic Places, despite opposition from the City Council of West Hollywood.

Amenities 
There is a farmers' market every Monday morning in the north parking lot. In 2001 a new community center was completed on the site designed by Koning Eizenberg Architecture, Inc. (see photograph).

It currently hosts the Los Angeles Sunday Assembly.

See also
 Plummer House

References 

Parks in West Hollywood, California
Plummer
California Historical Landmarks